Bob W. White is an full professor of social anthropology at the University of Montreal, Quebec, Canada. White earned his Ph.D. from McGill University in 1998, his M.A. from McGill University in 1993 and his B.A. from University of North Carolina at Chapel Hill in 1988. His research interests are intercultural communication, popular culture, cities and ethnographic fieldwork.

Publications 
Books:

Intercultural Cities: Policy and Practice for a New Era. Londres: Palgrave. 2018.

L'interculturel au Québec: rencontres historiques et enjeux politiques. avec Lomomba Emongo, Presses de l'Université de Montréal. 2014

Music and Globalization: Critical Encounters, Bloomington, Indiana University Press, mai 20112

Musique populaire et société à Kinshasa : Une ethnographie de l’écoute, édité avec Lye M. Yoka, Paris, Éditions L’Harmattan, 20103

Rumba Rules: The Politics of Dance Music in Mobutu’s Zaire, Duke University Press, 20084

Distinctions
Founder and director of the Laboratory for research on intercultural relations (LABRRI)
Expert for the Intercultural cities program of the Council of Europe
White won two prizes for his book the Rumba Rules: The Politics of Dance Music in Mobutu’s Zaire, the Anthony Leeds Prize in Urban Anthropology in 2009 and the Joel Gregory Prize in African Studies in 2010.

References

External links
 Bob W. White's profile, University of Montreal's website

Academic staff of the Université de Montréal
Canadian anthropologists
McGill University alumni
Cultural anthropologists
Social anthropologists
University of North Carolina at Chapel Hill alumni
Living people
Year of birth missing (living people)